The 1907 Prima Categoria season was won by Milan.

Qualifications

Piedmont
Played on January 13 and February 3

|}

Liguria
Played on January 13 and February 3

|}

Lombardy
Played on January 13 and February 3

|}

Final round

Final classification

Results

References and sources
Almanacco Illustrato del Calcio – La Storia 1898–2004, Panini Edizioni, Modena, September 2005

1907
1906–07 in European association football leagues
1906–07 in Italian football